Alexander Long (18 March 1900 – 31 December 1975) was a British rower. He competed in the men's eight event at the 1924 Summer Olympics.

References

External links
 

1900 births
1975 deaths
British male rowers
Olympic rowers of Great Britain
Rowers at the 1924 Summer Olympics
Place of birth missing